Wenji-maadab (recorded in English as Wain-che-mah-dub, Wen-ge-mah-dub or Wendjimadub, meaning "Where He Moves From Sitting") (born March 10, 1840, died February 14, 1920 or 1921), was a Chief of the Ojibwe tribe at White Earth Reservation in Minnesota.  He was a Mississippi Chippewa.  During Wenji-maadab's time, chiefhood was no longer a meaningful position of leadership, but an honorary title bestowed by the United States government.  However, Wenji-maadab was described by Gilfillan as "a genius, a truly, remarkably eloquent man...the best speaker, the greatest orator, I have ever met...his powers are remarkable.  He has all the vehemence, the fire, the energy, command of language, range of thought, of the true orator."

Wenji-maadab's Christian name was Joseph Charette.  He had three wives and thirteen children.  He was a Civil War veteran for the Union Army and served as President in 1910 for The 14th June Association.

References

1840 births
1920s deaths
Native American leaders
Ojibwe people
White Earth Band of Ojibwe